Conconully State Park is a  public recreation area located at the north end of Conconully Reservoir in the town of Conconully, Okanogan County, Washington. The park originated with the completion of the Conconully Dam in 1910, and came under the aegis of the Washington State Parks system in 1945. A replica courthouse cabin and the bell from the school that once stood in the park are found on the grounds. The park has  of shoreline and facilities for camping, boating, and picnicking.

References

External links

Conconully State Park Washington State Parks and Recreation Commission 
Conconully State Park Map Washington State Parks and Recreation Commission

Parks in Okanogan County, Washington
State parks of Washington (state)
Protected areas established in 1910